Liotia is a genus of very small sea snails, marine gastropod mollusks in the family Liotiidae.

Liotia is the type genus of the family Liotiidae.

Description
The species in this genus are small to minute. They have a depressed or turbinate shape. They are all umbilicated with a nacreous inner layer. The thickened outer lip, attached to the body whorl for a short length, is continuous. Where the operculum has been stated, it is horny and multispiral.

Species 
 Liotia admirabilis E. A. Smith, 1890
 Liotia affinis A. Adams, 1850
 Liotia arenula E. A. Smith, 1890
 Liotia atomus Issel, 1869
 Liotia cancellata (Gray, 1828)
 Liotia chilensis Osorio, 2012
 Liotia echinacantha Melvill & Standen, 1903
 Liotia fenestrata Carpenter, 1864
 Liotia microgrammata Dall, 1927
 Liotia romalea Melvill & Standen, 1903
 Liotia squamicostata E. A. Smith, 1903
 Liotia varicosa (Reeve, 1843)

Species brought into synonymy
 Liotia acrilla Dall, 1889: synonym of Cyclostrema cancellatum Marryat, 1818
 Liotia acryla Dall W.H., 1889: synonym of Cyclostrema cancellatum Marryat, 1818
 Liotia acuticostata  Carpenter, 1864: synonym of Lirularia acuticostata (Carpenter, 1864)
 Liotia admirabilis auct. non E. A. Smith, 1890: synonym of Macrarene digitata McLean, Absalao & Santos Cruz, 1988
 Liotia amabilis Dall, 1889: synonym of Cyclostrema amabile (Dall, 1889)
 Liotia annulata Tenison-Woods, J.E. 1879: synonym of Liotella annulata (Tenison-Woods, J.E. 1879)
 Liotia aspina Dall, 1889: synonym of Arene briareus (Dall, 1881)
 Liotia asteriscus Gould, 1859: synonym of Pseudoliotia asteriscus (Gould, 1859)
 Liotia bairdii Dall, 1889: synonym of Arene bairdii (Dall, 1889)
 Liotia bellula H. Adams, 1873: synonym of Bothropoma bellulum (H. Adams, 1873)
 Liotia brasiliana Dall, 1927: synonym of Arene brasiliana (Dall, 1927)
 Liotia briareus Dall, 1881: synonym of Arene briareus (Dall, 1881)
 Liotia californica Dall, 1908: synonym of Arene californica (Dall, 1908)
 Liotia carinata Carpenter, 1857: synonym of Arene lurida (Dall, 1913)
 Liotia centrifuga Dall, 1896: synonym of Arene centrifuga (Dall, 1896)
 Liotia cookeana Dall, 1918: synonym of Liotia fenestrata Carpenter, 1864
 Liotia dautzenbergi Bavay, 1917: synonym of Astrosansonia dautzenbergi (Bavay, 1917)
 Liotia discoidea Reeve, 1843: synonym of Pseudoliotina discoidea (Reeve, 1843)
 Liotia disjuncta Hedley, C. 1903: synonym of Liocarinia disjuncta (Hedley, C. 1903)
 Liotia erici Strong & Hertlein, 1939: synonym of Haplocochlias erici (Strong & Hertlein, 1939)
 Liotia fulgens Gould, 1859: synonym of Turbo cidaris cidaris Gmelin, 1791
 Liotia gemma auct. non Tuomey & Holmes, 1856: synonym of Arene tricarinata (Stearns, 1872)
 Liotia hedleyi Prichard & Gatliff, 1899: synonym of Munditia hedleyi (Prichard & Gatliff, 1899)
 Liotia heimi Strong & Hertlein, 1939: synonym of Parviturbo stearnsii (Dall, 1918)
 Liotia huesonica Dall, 1927: synonym of Cyclostrema huesonicum (Dall, 1927)
 Liotia incerta Tenison-Woods, 1877: synonym of Munditia tasmanica (Tenison-Woods, 1875)
 Liotia krausii Gray J.E. in Gray M.E., 1850: synonym of Pseudotorinia kraussi J.E. Gray in M.E. Gray, 1850
 Liotia lamellosa Schepman, 1908: synonym of Bathyliotina lamellosa (Schepman, 1908)
 Liotia lucasensis Strong, 1934: synonym of Haplocochlias lucasensis (Strong, 1934)
 Liotia lurida Dall, 1913: synonym of Arene lurida (Dall, 1913)
 Liotia mayana Tate, R. 1899: synonym of Munditia mayana (Tate, 1899)
 Liotia microforis Dall, 1889: synonym of Arene microforis (Dall, 1889)
 Liotia minima Tenison-Woods, 1878: synonym of Lodderena minima (Tenison-Woods, 1878)
 Liotia miniata Dall, 1889: synonym of Arene miniata (Dall, 1889)
 Liotia nitida Verrill & Smith, 1885: synonym of Eccliseogyra nitida (Verrill & Smith, 1885)
 Liotia olivacea Dall, 1918: synonym of Arene olivacea (Dall, 1918)
 Liotia pacis Dall, 1908: synonym of Arene pacis (Dall, 1908)
 Liotia perforata Dall, 1889: synonym of Arene briareus (Dall, 1881)
 Liotia pergemma Gardner, 1948: synonym of  Arene tricarinata (Stearns, 1872)
 Liotia planorbis Dall, 1927: synonym of Palazzia planorbis (Dall, 1927)
 Liotia polypleura Hedley, 1904: synonym of Liotella polypleura (Hedley, 1904)
 Liotia radiata Kiener, 1838: synonym of Arene cruentata (Mühlfeld, 1824)
 Liotia riisei Rehder, 1943: synonym of Arene riisei Rehder, 1943
 Liotia rostrata Hedley, 1900: synonym of Canimarina rostrata (Hedley, 1900)
 Liotia siderea Angas, 1865: synonym of Munditia tasmanica (Tenison-Woods, 1875)
 Liotia socorroensis Strong, 1934: synonym of Arene socorroensis (Strong, 1934)
 Liotia subquadrata Tenison-Woods, 1878: synonym of Munditia subquadrata (Tenison-Woods, 1878)
 Liotia tasmanica Tenison-Woods, 1875: synonym of Munditia tasmanica (Tenison-Woods, 1875)
 Liotia tortugana Dall, 1927: synonym of Cyclostrema tortuganum (Dall, 1927)
 Liotia tricarinata Stearns, 1872: synonym of  Arene tricarinata (Stearns, 1872)
 Liotia trullata Dall, 1889: synonym of Arene bairdii (Dall, 1889)
 Liotia variabilis Dall, 1889: synonym of Arene variabilis (Dall, 1889)
 Liotia venusta Woodring, 1928: synonym of Arene venusta (Woodring, 1928) (primary homonym of Liotia venusta Hedley, 1901)
 Liotia venusta Hedley, 1901: synonym of Circulus venustus (Hedley, 1901)

References

 Iredale, T. & McMichael, D.F., 1962 A reference list of the marine Mollusca of New South Wales. Mem. Aust. Mus., 11:0-0.

 
Liotiidae
Taxa named by John Edward Gray